Lydiate Ash is  a hamlet in North Worcestershire, England, consisting of a few houses, the road gritting and works depot for Worcestershire County Council and the gritting depot for National Highways. It is in the district of Bromsgrove, to the south-west of Birmingham.

The site is now best known for the Lydiate Ash roundabout, where the A38 and A491 main roads connect to the M5 motorway at the latter's junction 4.

Hamlets in Worcestershire
Roundabouts in England
Motorway junctions in England
Transport in Worcestershire